Papua New Guinea competed at the 2019 World Championships in Athletics in Doha, Qatar, from 27 September 2019.

Rellie Kaputin, initially selected, was replaced by another athlete due to her injury in August.

Results

Women
Track and road events

References

Nations at the 2019 World Athletics Championships
World Championships in Athletics
Papua New Guinea at the World Championships in Athletics